Crosby is a coastal town in the Metropolitan Borough of Sefton, Merseyside, England. Historically in Lancashire, it is north of Bootle, south of Southport and Formby, and west of Netherton. It abuts the areas of Blundellsands to the north and Waterloo to the south. It is approximately 6 
miles (9.6 km) north of Liverpool City Centre.

History
The town has Viking roots in common with the other -by suffixed settlements of Formby to the north and Kirkby to the east. Crosby was known as Krossabyr
in Old Norse, meaning "village with the cross".
The settlement was recorded in the Domesday Book of 1086 as Crosebi, and by the year 1212 had become Crosseby. Local people are known as Crosbeians and were referred to as such in the local press but the term is little used today.

The opening of the Liverpool, Crosby and Southport Railway in 1848 resulted in the growth of Crosby as a suburb of Liverpool.

Governance
Crosby formed part of the Crosby parliamentary constituency from 1950 until 2010. The Member of Parliament (MP) for Crosby from 1997 until 2010 was Claire Curtis-Thomas, a member of the Labour Party; prior to her election the seat was generally considered to be a safe Conservative Party stronghold with Tory MPs elected at every election barring the 1981 Crosby by-election where Shirley Williams of the Social Democratic Party was elected to represent the constituency. As a result of boundary revisions for the 2010 general election the Crosby constituency was abolished and Crosby town was divided between two constituencies, with the two electoral wards of South Crosby, Church and Victoria, containing the urbanised bulk of the town which includes the areas of Great Crosby, Waterloo and Seaforth, being absorbed into the expanded Bootle constituency, represented by the Labour MP Peter Dowd, and the two electoral wards of northern Crosby, Blundellsands and Manor, which contains residential suburban areas such as, Blundellsands, Brighton-Le-Sands, Little Crosby, Thornton, and Hightown, forming part of the new Sefton Central constituency represented by Bill Esterson, also a Labour MP.

Administration
Crosby became part of the municipal borough of Crosby in 1937 by the merger of the urban districts of Great Crosby and Waterloo with Seaforth, both in the administrative county of Lancashire. This borough was succeeded by the new Metropolitan Borough of Sefton in Merseyside on 1 April 1974.

For elections to Sefton Council Crosby is covered by a range of council wards as detailed above: the Victoria ward, covers Great Crosby and North Waterloo, and is represented by three councillors. They are now all Labour Party councillors Michael Roche, Leslie Byrom CBE FRCIS, and Jan Grace.

Twin towns and sister cities
Crosby, Merseyside is twinned with
  Capri, Italy

Geography
Crosby as an area was composed of a string of settlements along the Irish Sea coast. These areas were part of the urban districts of Great Crosby and Waterloo with Seaforth and the Municipal Borough of Crosby before it too was abolished and became part of the Metropolitan Borough of Sefton. These areas are:

Great Crosby – The main area which gave the town and the old municipal borough its name, despite the confusion that exists, Great Crosby is not the actual town itself but is the largest area of it which was an urban district in its own right which merged with Waterloo with Seaforth urban district to form the Municipal Borough of Crosby and defined the town of Crosby in its present borders.
Little Crosby – A small village considered to be the oldest existent Roman Catholic village in England.
Blundellsands – An area to the north west of Great Crosby. It abuts the northern section of Crosby Beach, the location of Antony Gormley's Another Place.
Waterloo – An area situated southwest of Great Crosby, originally known as Crosby Seabank. It includes Crosby Civic Hall and Library, and the Plaza Community Cinema. It abuts the southern section of Crosby Beach, the location of Antony Gormley's Another Place.
Brighton-le-Sands – An area situated between Blundellsands to the north, Waterloo to the south and Great Crosby to the east.
Thornton – A village situated to the northeast of Great Crosby.

Climate

Demography

At the 2001 UK census, Crosby had a population of 51,789. Of those over 16 years old, 31.2% were single (never married), 43.2% married and 8.2% divorced. The proportion of divorced people was above that of Sefton and England (both 6.6%), and the incidences of those who were single and married differed significantly from the national and Sefton averages (Sefton: 43.1% single, 35.5% married; England: 44.3% single, 34.7% married). Sefton's 21,250 households included 32.7% one-person, 35.7% married couples living together, 6.6% were co-habiting couples, and 11.3% single parents with their children. Of those aged 16–74, 28.1% had no academic qualifications, similar to 28.9% in all of England and slightly lower than the 31.0% for the Sefton borough.

Education
Independent schools in the area include Merchant Taylors' Boys School, Merchant Taylors' Girls' School, St Mary's College and Streatham Arts School. There are also several comprehensive schools, including Chesterfield High School, Holy Family Catholic High School, St. Michael's Church of England High School (formerly Manor High Secondary School) and Sacred Heart Catholic College (formerly Sacred Heart Catholic High School, formally Seafield Grammar School).

Primary schools include Forefield Junior school Great Crosby Catholic school

Places of interest

Crosby Beach is home to Antony Gormley's art installation Another Place. The sea views were described in the 19th Century by a First Lord of the Admiralty as second only to the Bay of Naples. Crosby's environs include several miles of beach, a marina, a number of parks and a large area of woodland known as Ince Woods. Crosby is home to a now closed Carnegie Library built with donations from the American steel magnate Andrew Carnegie. Distinctive buildings in Crosby Village include the art nouveau-inspired Crown Buildings and ten pubs – The Crows Nest, The Birkey, The George, Blues Bar, Frankies, Stamps, Gambino's, Corkscrew, Hampsons and The Village.

In recent years Crosby has featured in The Sunday Times "Best Places to Live" list.

Transport
Crosby is served by the railway stations of Hall Road, Blundellsands and Crosby, and Waterloo, on the Northern Line of the region's commuter rail network, Merseyrail. Bus services run by Arriva and Stagecoach link the town to Liverpool, Southport and Preston.

Sport
Marine AFC (association football) and Waterloo RUFC (rugby union) are both based in the area. 

Crosby is also home to Crosby Swimming Club, a member of the Amateur Swimming Association (ASA). Who are also in m and d division one and headed by head coach Lee Martin and supported by many other experienced coaches such as Nigel Forshaw, Damien Lyons and Ben Gilbertson

The Northern Club, a multi-sport club featuring cricket, hockey, crown green bowls, squash, racketball and snooker, is situated in the Moor Park area of Crosby. Near Thornton

Crosby Marina is the home of Crosby Sailing Club and is open to all dinghy sailors of any ability or experience. The marina is also a venue for the Crosby Scout and Guide Marina Club, who offer dinghy and kayak sailing to local youngsters.

Blundellsands Bridge Club, affiliated to the English Bridge Union, provides facilities for learning and playing Rubber Bridge and Duplicate Bridge.

Notable people

 Alicia McGiverin
 Frank Cottrell Boyce
 Martyn Andrews
 Cherie Blair
 Kenny Everett
 J. Bruce Ismay
 Vincent Nichols
 Anne Robinson
 Robert Runcie
 Laurie Taylor
 Johnny Wheeler
 Ronnie Moran
John Virgo
John Parrott

See also
 Congregational Church, Great Crosby

References

External links

Liverpool Street Gallery – Liverpool 23
Titanic Town – Crosby's seafaring connections
When Liverpool was Dixie – Crosby's links to the American Civil War
The Crosby Herald online newspaper

 
Towns in Merseyside
Towns and villages in the Metropolitan Borough of Sefton
Liverpool Urban Area
Unparished areas in Merseyside